"Bobby Bitch" is the second single by American rapper Bobby Shmurda. The song is produced by Dondre Dennis. It was released for digital download on September 30, 2014 by Epic Records and GS9, as the second single from Shmurda's debut EP Shmurda She Wrote. The official remix features Rowdy Rebel and Rich the Kid. Some of the vocals of the song were sampled in XXXTentacion's song, "I Love It When They Run".

Music video
The official music video was uploaded to Shmurda's Vevo account on Friday November 7, 2014.

Charts

Certifications

References

External links
 Full lyrics of this song at Rap Genius

2014 singles
2014 songs
Epic Records singles
Hardcore hip hop songs